Thunder Island may refer to:
 Thunder Island (album), a 1977 album by Jay Ferguson
 "Thunder Island" (song), a 1977 song by Jay Ferguson
 Thunder Island (1963 film), an American action film
 Thunder Island (1921 film), an American silent adventure film